is a women's football club playing in Japan's football league, WE League. Its hometown is the city of Hiroshima.

Kits

Kit suppliers and shirt sponsors

Club staff

Player

Current squad

Season-by-season records

See also
Japan Football Association (JFA)
2022–23 in Japanese football
List of women's football clubs in Japan

References

External links
 

Sanfrecce Hiroshima
Women's football clubs in Japan
2020 establishments in Japan
Japan Women's Football League teams
Sports teams in Hiroshima
Association football clubs established in 2020
WE League clubs